Sylvi Listhaug (born 25 December 1977) is a Norwegian politician serving as the leader of the Progress Party since 2021. She previously served  as Minister for the Elderly and Public Health of Norway under Prime Minister Erna Solberg from May to December 2019. In addition, she has also served as the Minister of Petroleum and Energy of Norway from December 2019 to January 2020. Listhaug served as Norway's first Minister of Immigration and Integration from 2015 to 2018, a specially created cabinet position during the European migrant crisis, and Minister of Agriculture and Food from 2013 to 2015. She served as Minister of Justice, Public Security and Immigration from January 2018 until her resignation in March 2018. Originally from the rural municipality of Ørskog in Sunnmøre, she began her political career in Oslo as City Commissioner of Welfare and Social Services.

As Minister of Migration and Integration, Listhaug reduced the number of asylum seekers arriving in Norway from 30,000 in 2015 to 2,000 in 2017. Although the drop in asylum seekers was partially linked to an overall fall in traffic to Europe, Listhaug was credited with proposing and securing support for many new regulations and overseeing the tightening of the system, which resulted in a 19-year low in number of new asylum arrivals.

She is currently serving as a member of the Storting and the Standing Committee on Health and Care Services. Listhaug has been called a "rising star" in the Progress Party by both national and international media. She has been mentioned by long-time party chairman Carl I. Hagen as a candidate to succeed Siv Jensen as party leader. Listhaug was constituted as First Deputy Leader of the Progress Party in September 2018.

Early life and education
Listhaug was born in Ålesund. She was raised on the family farm in Ørskog, Møre og Romsdal, to which she has odelsrett. Her father worked with transportation, while her mother ran the family farm. She has two twin siblings.

In 1995 Listhaug began to work as a care assistant at the Ørskog home for the elderly, and from 1996 to 2000 she studied history, social sciences, and special education at the Volda University College, and continued to work at the Ørskog home to support herself during her student years. In 2000 she graduated and qualified as a teacher, and from 2000 to 2001 she worked as a teacher at the Sjøholt school in Ørskog.

Political career

Early career and parliament
Listhaug began her political involvement locally in Ørskog. She has held several positions within the Progress Party and its youth organisation Progress Party's Youth since 1998, and has been a member of the Progress Party central board since 2005. She worked as political advisor and aide to the Progress Party's parliamentary group from 2001 to 2004. In 2005 she had a stay abroad as an intern in the United States House of Representatives. She has been a deputy representative in the Norwegian parliament from Møre og Romsdal (2001 to 2009), and from Oslo (2009 to 2013), with a total 95 days of parliamentary session served. She was elected as a parliamentary representative for the first time in 2017 (from Møre og Romsdal).

Oslo city commissioner
Listhaug was appointed city commissioner (byråd) of welfare and social services in the city government of Oslo in 2006, having been secretary to the previous commissioner Margaret Eckbo. Listhaug spearheaded a number of reforms as commissioner, introducing free choice in home care, and reintroducing senior homes in her first year. She stated as her goals more competition and better nursing homes, and opening for more private companies.

In 2009 she became the subject of a nursing home funding scandal, after it was revealed that a company that had been granted a total amount of 23,5 million NOK from Oslo municipality to build nursing homes for Norwegians in Altea, Spain had not yet even been granted a Spanish construction permit. Listhaug claimed she was not responsible for the plans, which were designed to make Oslo a prime example for other municipalities in regards to care for the elderly. Listhaug told reporters from the state broadcaster NRK in March 2010 that she did “not have the responsibility for the construction of the nursing home nor authoring the contracts.”

Other proposals by Listhaug as city commissioner included a stricter policy on psychiatric patients, and putting up posters of convicted rapists in their local community. Before the gay parade in Oslo in 2009, Listhaug suggested to some controversy that "half and almost wholly naked people dancing around in the streets of Oslo" could rather lead to less tolerance of homosexuals, thus working against its goal, although she made clear that homosexuals should be able to party "when and where they want".

Political consultant 
From 2012 until her cabinet appointment, Listhaug had worked as a senior consultant with First House, a Norwegian strategic advisory, corporate communications, governmental affairs and crisis management/issue management agency. Shortly after her appointment, media attention centered on her decision to keep secret her list of clients during her time in the job. The list of public clients was made public in early 2014 after Listhaug herself declared a personal conflict of interest.

Minister of Agriculture (2013–2015) 

On 16 October 2013 Listhaug was appointed Minister of Agriculture and Food in the new Solberg Cabinet. The Solberg government signalled a drastic change of course in Norwegian agricultural policy by opening for more freely sale and purchase of farms, and seeking a development towards more sustainable fewer and bigger farms. Listhaug as Minister of Agriculture sought to remove laws which require farm-owners to live on the farm. Listhaug argued her changes would lead to a more efficient food production in Norway, ultimately reducing high food prices. She also lowered government subsidies to farmers, who receive one of the highest government subsidies in the world, according to the OECD. As an example, Norwegian farmers receive over 50% of their farm income as government support, while the equivalent number for U.S. farmers is 8%.

As Listhaug in 2010 had called the Norwegian agricultural policy a "communist system" in an op-ed, this received widespread attention in media and social media. After being pressured with the comment in a television debate, she stated her intent on following the new government's policy agreement. Prior comments by Listhaug and the new government's course was met with scepticism and protest among some farmers.

During her time as Minister of Agriculture and Food, Listhaug had, somewhat controversially, contacts with clients of First House, including the farmers’ organization Norges Bondelaget, the NHO employers’ organization unit representing food and beverage firm, the brewing organization Bryggeriforeningen, and supermarket chain Rema 1000, one of her last clients for First House before she joined the government herself.

Minister of Immigration (2015–2018)
On 16 December 2015 Listhaug was appointed Minister of Immigration and Integration, a newly formed cabinet position under the Ministry of Justice and Public Security, amid the European migrant crisis and record-high numbers of asylum seekers in Norway that resulted in a broad parliamentary agreement to tighten asylum regulations. The month prior to her appointment Listhaug criticised what she described as a "tyranny of goodness" haunting the Norwegian immigration debate, and that it would be more Christian and reasonable to help as many people as possible through foreign aid to refugees abroad rather than aiding fewer and more costly asylum seekers in Norway. She later vowed that her proposed asylum regulations would make Norway's asylum policies "one of the strictest in Europe".

The first four months of 2016 saw asylum applications in Norway drop to its lowest levels since 1993, with only about 250 new applications each month. The reduction resulted in at least  800 million (100 million) being saved in direct asylum reception costs alone in the revised annual state budget, amid budget strains due to the low oil price. Listhaug has since called for further immigration and asylum restrictions to be implemented, particularly in family reunifications which reached all-time highs of about 20,000 in 2017. Among her proposals is that family reunifications should rather be achieved in the native countries of immigrants instead of in Norway.

Opinion polls consistently showed Listhaug to have the highest approval rating of all government ministers from her party, and several others. In September 2016, a poll showed that 59% of Norway's population approved of her work on immigration, with less than a quarter disapproving.

In August 2017, a row took place between Listhaug and Sweden's political establishment after Listhaug planned a visit to the Swedish suburb of Rinkeby in the context of the country's vulnerable areas, having warned during her time as minister about the need to avoid "Swedish conditions" in Norway. Although meeting with other Swedish officials, Sweden's Minister for Migration Heléne Fritzon cancelled her scheduled meeting with Listhaug, saying she would not be part of an "election campaign" in the run-up to the Norwegian parliamentary election in September.

Minister of Justice (2018) 

After securing renewed support for the centre-right coalition in the 2017 parliamentary election, Listhaug was appointed Minister of Justice, Public Security and Immigration in January 2018, absorbing her former cabinet position following a government re-shuffle. As Minister of Justice, Listhaug “waged a war” against pedophile perpetrators, both internationally and domestically. Listhaug introduced new legislation which would remove the passports from pedophiles committing assaults abroad, and it caused controversy when she unapologetically referred to these individuals as “monsters.”

In March 2018 Listhaug posted a Facebook message claiming that the Labour Party "cares more about the rights of terrorists than national security" following disagreement on a parliamentary vote about whether the state should be able to withdraw the citizenship of threats to national security. After insisting for several days amid criticism that no apology was warranted other than stating regret if offending anyone, the government led by Prime Minister Solberg, and eventually Listhaug herself apologised for the post in parliament. As Listhaug's initial apology was considered "not good enough" by Labour leader Jonas Gahr Støre, this caused the opposition, including Labour and the Centre Party to state their support for a motion of no confidence pushed by the Red Party. The day before the vote on 20 March, the Christian Democrats also concluded they would support the motion, thereby indicating a parliamentary majority for the motion of no confidence. Listhaug resigned herself in the morning before the parliamentary session.

After eight years of decreasing membership numbers, the Progress Party received 5,350 new members, making up 25 percent of the party's total membership following the conflict. One opinion poll also briefly showed a doubling of voter support for the party. The new party members were seen by political scientists to make up a new power-base for Listhaug within the party.

First deputy leader (2018–2021) 
In June 2018, Sylvi Listhaug was nominated by Møre og Romsdal Progress Party as a candidate for first deputy leader of the Progress Party. The party's annual national meeting will constitute a new deputy leader on 3 September 2018, in order to replace Per Sandberg. State broadcaster NRK reported in August 2018 that Listhaug likely will be elected by the central board. Listhaug told reporters in Arendal: "I am humbled and honored to be mentioned as a deputy leader candidate", and added “I am ready to serve if the party wants me in such a role."

On 3 September 2018, the Progress Party's Central Board unanimously voted to constitute Listhaug as acting first deputy leader of the party. The formal election took take place during the party's national convention in May 2019.

Following Siv Jensen’s resignation, the party designated Listhaug as their leader. She had previously accepted to become leader shortly after Jensen’s resignation, and was officially elected at the party conference in May.

Party leader
Listhaug was elected party leader at the party convention on 8 May 2021, with Ketil Solvik-Olsen and Terje Søviknes as first and second deputy leaders respectively.

Listhaug lead her party into the 2021 election, campaigning for increased petroleum activity and against the left’s environmental policies. Her party ended up losing 6 seats in the Storting, decreasing their seat count to 21.

In November, shortly after the resignation of Eva Kristin Hansen, Listahug went out against Storting Director Marianne Andreassen after her responses to her questions about parliamentary apartments. She described some of Andreassen’s answers as informative, but that others would be worth looking more into. Listahug also demanded more detailed answers when it came to if the apartment rules could be punishable if broken.

In June 2022, shortly after the engagement of Princess Märtha Louise and Durek Verrett, Listhaug responded to discrimination comments made against the latter, saying: “I think it's awful that he gets such feedback from people. I believe that it does not matter what background you have, the most important thing is that you love each other”. She went on to say: “I think Märtha Louise must be allowed to marry whoever she wants. It is clear that there have been a number of proposals that have deserved to be debated, including cancer treatment. But Verrett must endure it. He must endure being contradicted and his proposals being discussed. But if Verrett and Märtha Louise want to get married because they love each other, then it is a private matter, and then it does not matter what skin colour you have. You should respect that”.

Minister of the Elderly and Public Health (2019) 
Sylvi Listhaug was appointed Minister for the elderly and public health on 3 May 2019 in Erna Solberg's coalition government. She was minister in the Ministry of Health and Care Services alongside Health Minister Bent Høie.

On 6 May 2019, she sparred controversy when she, newly appointed as the new health minister, told reporters from NRK: "People should be allowed to smoke, drink and eat as much red meat as much as they want. The authorities may like to inform, but people know pretty much what is healthy and what is not healthy, I think." The secretary general of the Norwegian Cancer Society, Anne Lise Ryel, said Listhaug's comments were “potentially harmful to public health.”

Minister of Petroleum and Energy (2019–2020)
On 18 December 2019, Listhaug assumed office as the Minister of Petroleum and Energy.
In January 2020, she and the rest of Progress Party ministers withdrew from the government after a dispute over the return of an IS woman and her children. Listhaug was subsequently replaced by Tina Bru on 24 January when her party had formally left the government, and returned to opposition. Her tenure as Minister of Petroleum and Energy is the shortest in Norwegian history since Grete Faremo in 1996.

Political views

Listhaug believes that the elderly should have legal rights to a place in private nursing homes paid by public funding. She has advocated "zero tolerance" on crime, more visible police, and said that integration has to become better by having stricter demands on people who move to Norway, combined with a more restrictive immigration policy.

Although a lifelong Christian, Listhaug has considered leaving the Church of Norway which she has described as "thoroughly socialist", due to the former Red-Green government's interventionist policy on appointment of bishops, as well as church leaders in her view voicing political opinions on too many issues. Favoring a separation of church and state, she has pointed to it "working well" in the United States. She has been a repeat guest on the Christian television channel Visjon Norge.

Listhaug is in favor of immigrant repatriation from Norway. She has advocated voluntary return, in her role as Integration Minister, for rejected asylum seekers and other migrants. She has stated that Norway needed to "entice more [people] to voluntarily travel back" to their homelands, claiming it was "better for us to encourage them to travel back", rather than face deportation and would ultimately save Norway money. During her government tenure, record numbers of illegal immigrants were simultaneously deported from Norway. Listhaug has stated her position that "I think those who come to Norway need to adapt to our society. Here we eat pork, drink alcohol and show our face. You must abide by the values, laws and regulations that are in Norway when you come here." Her proposals includes calling for a ban on the hijab in elementary schools.

Listhaug is a proponent of banning full-face veils and hijabs in elementary schools, arguing that “we need to fight the culture of social control and controlling women.” She is a proponent of barring hate preachers from entering Norway.

Migration policy

She is noted for her hard-line immigration policy. As Minister of Migration and Integration, Listhaug presented a 150-page document with 40 proposals for new asylum- and migration regulations, in which she claimed would make Norway's migrant policy “one of the strictest in Europe.” The proposals, which failed to summon necessary parliamentary support in June 2016, included proposals such as:

More efficient ID clarification procedures;
Simplifying the process for the refusal of asylum applications;
Introducing temporary protection until age 18 for unaccompanied minors;
Greater opportunity for deporting persons whose applications proved to be unfounded;
Stricter integration criteria for permanent residency;
Tighter restrictions on right to family reunification.

The proposal also included procedures which would allow detaining migrants who submit “obviously groundless asylum claims” for up to 72 hours, in order to prevent them from evading deportation. Speaking to state broadcaster NRK, Sylvi Listhaug said: “We can see that unfounded asylum seekers disappear while the police are processing their applications. This will prohibit them from running off and eventually getting involved in criminal activity. Now we will know where we have them, get their applications processed and then return them.” Minister Listhaug added that 90 out of 537 asylum seekers processed under the 48-hour procedure in 2015 disappeared, and that the locations of ninety percent of those still remain unknown to authorities. The proposals also would expand the ability of law enforcement agencies to store and acquire biometric information such as fingerprints, in order to determine whether an asylum applicant may present a security threat.

In Listhaug's response to the parliament's rejection of her proposals for stricter migration policies, she stated: “This is primarily a shame for the Norwegian nation. We need a sustainable policy that safeguards the Norwegian welfare model. The level of immigration to Norway will be a decisive factor in this.” Shortly after, Sylvi Listhaug traveled to Canada in order to learn more about the Canadian private sponsorship program for refugees.

Speaking to reporters from Ynet in 2017, Listhaug told reporters that she believes fewer illegal immigrants are coming to Norway due to the fact that Norway deports undocumented migrants back to their country of origin. As immigration minister, Listhaug went on a trip visiting three countries in East Africa with the goal of implementing new return agreements. In advance of the trip, Listhaug told reporters: “Return policy is highly prioritized in Norway, so it will be natural for us to ensure that people who are not entitled to stay in Norway can be returned to the countries from which they come from.”

Sweden's Migration Minister Heléne Fritzon canceled a meeting due to be held with Sylvi Listhaug in August 2017, claiming that Listhaug spread an “inaccurate image of Sweden.” Listhaug said in an interview with Verdens Gang that “parallel societies have developed in more than 60 places in Sweden”, calling them “no-go zones”, while insisting that there are conditions of lawlessness in some areas with large quantities of people with immigrant backgrounds.

Law and order
As Minister of Justice, Listhaug received criticism and praise for calling pedophile perpetrators “monsters.” Listhaug announced more legislative changes to stop pedophiles committing assaults abroad, and told reporters: “It is absolutely terrible to think that these monsters are allowed to leave our country and travel to places where poor families and poor children are exploited in the worst way.” Listhaug added that “we must do whatever we can to stop them.” She is a proponent of stripping these individuals of their passports when sentenced for this type of abuse, not allowing them to leave the country.

She has advocated for "zero tolerance" on crime and called for more visible police, primarily in the capital of Oslo. She has advocated for stricter punishments and harsher prison sentencing, particularly for crimes against children. Listhaug is opposed to capital punishment.

Agricultural policy
Listhaug served as Minister of Agriculture and Food from 2013 to 2015, and implemented new agricultural policies signaling a drastic change of course. The new policies allowed for more freely sales- and purchases of farms, while also seeking fewer and bigger, sustainable farms. As minister, she lowered government payments to farmers, who receive one of the highest levels of government subsidies in the world, according to the OECD. During her tenure, the department also sought to scrap the law which makes it a duty to live on the farm. The changes could lead to larger farms and a more efficient food production, which the department argued would reduce the country's high food prices.

Foreign policy
A strong supporter of Israel with her study trip to the country during her teacher studies, Listhaug has voiced support for moving the Norwegian embassy in Israel from Tel Aviv to Jerusalem.

Listhaug told reporters in 2017 that European nations “and their citizens need to understand the situation in Israel better,” and added that “the Progress Party has always been a supporter of Israel’s need to protect themselves in a region where you are the only democracy.” She made it clear that the party does not necessarily support everything the State of Israel does, but stated that “you have a right to defend your people and your borders because you live in a region that has a lot of problems.”

During the 2016 U.S. presidential election, Listhaug stated to Verdens Gang that she tends to support the Republican Party, however, not Donald Trump. She made it clear that she was “no fan of Hillary Clinton”, but was concerned about Trump's statements regarding NATO and free trade. Listhaug is noted as an admirer of Ronald Reagan.

Social issues
Listhaug originally opposed the introduction of same-sex marriage in Norway in 2009, but in 2017 said she had turned to support it and become critical of Visjon Norge leader Jan Hanvold.

Job approval ratings
Sylvi Listhaug received the highest approval rating of all government ministers from her party during her tenure as Minister of Immigration. An August 2016 poll by Ipsos for Dagbladet showed her job approval rating at 59%, up from 55% in May.

Political resume
Listhaug's experience in parliament and government include:

 2001–2004: Political advisor for Church, Education and Research Fraction, Progress Party's parliamentary group.
 2001–2005: Substitute member of the parliament for Oslo.
 2002–2006: Member of the Progress Party's Youth central board.
 2004–2005: Council secretary of welfare and social services.
 2005: Intern for Congressman Mark Kirk (R-IL) in the U.S. House of Representatives.
 2005–2009: Substitute member of the parliament for Møre og Romsdal.
 2005–present: Member of the Progress Party's central board.
 2006–2010: Oslo City Commissioner of Welfare and Social Services.
 2009–2013: Substitute member of the parliament for Oslo.
 2010–2012: Council member for Health and care for the elderly.
 2013–2015: Minister of Agriculture and Food.
 2015–2018: Minister of Immigration and Integration.
 2017–2021: Member of the parliament for Møre og Romsdal.
 2017–2021: Member of the parliament's Standing Committee on Health and Care Services.
 2018: Minister of Justice, Public Security and Immigration.
 2018–present: First Deputy Leader of the Progress Party
 2019: Minister of the Elderly and Public Health.
 2019–2020: Minister of Petroleum and Energy

Personal life
Listhaug is married to fellow Progress Party politician Espen Espeset, and together they have one daughter and two sons. Raised on the family farm in Ørskog in Sunnmøre, Listhaug currently resides in Oslo.

Publications
In 2018, Listhaug announced she would publish a book. Her book, Der Andre Tier, was published by Kagge later that year.

References

External links

 
 
 

|-

1977 births
Living people
People from Ørskog
Politicians from Ålesund
21st-century Norwegian politicians
Norwegian Lutherans
Volda University College alumni
Norwegian educators
Norwegian expatriates in Israel
Norwegian expatriates in the United States
Progress Party (Norway) politicians
Møre og Romsdal politicians
Politicians from Oslo
Deputy members of the Storting
Members of the Storting
Women members of the Storting
Government ministers of Norway
Ministers of Agriculture and Food of Norway
Women government ministers of Norway
Female justice ministers
Ministers of Justice of Norway